"You Were There" is a song by Australian pop-rock band Southern Sons. It was released in March 1993 as the third single taken from their second studio album, Nothing But the Truth (1992). The song peaked at number 6 in Australia, becoming the band's third top ten single. It also gained popularity in the Philippines.

The song featured in the Sydney Dance Company's production of Beauty and the Beast.

Track listing
CD single  (74321134562)

Charts

Weekly charts

Year-end chart

Sales and certifications

References

External links
 "You Were There" by Southern Sons at Discogs

1992 songs
1993 singles
Southern Sons songs
Bertelsmann Music Group singles
Rock ballads
1990s ballads